Valayanchirangara is a village in the Ernakulam district of Kerala state, India. It is 7 km away from Perumbavoor. The name Valayanchirangara means "Valanja Chirayude Kara", a land on the shore of a curve shaped pond. Valayanchirangara is under Kunnathunadu Taluk and a converging place of three Panchayats: Vengola, Mazhuvanoor and Rayamangalam. Here exists an 'A' graded library (VNKPS Library), Schools from KG levels to +2, a college under MG University, traditional temples, churches, mosques , Drama theater called Suvarna Theaters, banks, a telephone exchange, post office & electricity board, hospitals, various shops and business ventures. The main central road (a State Highway-MC Road) connecting to NH-47 at Angamaly is ½km away running parallel to Valayanchirangara.

It is located at a distance of 23 km from the ernakulam district collectorate at kakkanad. The nearest railway station is Aluva (18 km) and airport is Cochin International airport at Nedumbassery (21 km). It comes under Chalakudy lok sabha constituency & Kunnathunadu assembly constituency. Barnabas, the American head of the Malankara Orthodox Church, died here.  It is known as the famous pilgrimage center of the Orthodox Church.

References

External links  
www.valayanchirangara.in

Villages in Ernakulam district